František Mysliveček (born June 19, 1965) is a former Czech football player.

He played in the Gambrinus liga for FK Teplice. After finishing his active career as a footballer, he started to work as a football official. In 2005, while he was an official at FC Slovan Liberec, he was fined and banned for two years by the Football Association for match fixing. In January 2010, he became the sport director of FC Viktoria Plzeň.

Club statistics

References

External links

1965 births
Living people
Czech footballers
Czech First League players
FK Teplice players
J1 League players
Japan Football League (1992–1998) players
JEF United Chiba players
Ventforet Kofu players
Vegalta Sendai players
Czech expatriate footballers
Expatriate footballers in Japan

Association football midfielders